Michal Jeřábek (born 10 September 1993) is a professional Czech football player who plays as a centre-back for Czech First League club Trinity Zlín. He has also played for the national under-21 team. Having played 35 games for Dukla Prague, Jeřábek signed for Teplice in January 2016. On 8 January 2023, he joined Trinity Zlín.

References

External links
 
 
 
 

1993 births
Living people
Czech footballers
Czech expatriate footballers
Czech Republic under-21 international footballers
Association football defenders
Czech First League players
Kazakhstan Premier League players
FK Dukla Prague players
FK Teplice players
FK Jablonec players
FC Aktobe players
MFK Zemplín Michalovce players
Czech expatriate sportspeople in Kazakhstan
Czech expatriate sportspeople in Slovakia
Expatriate footballers in Kazakhstan
Expatriate footballers in Slovakia
FC Fastav Zlín players